Christina Grand was born February 17 in New Jersey, United States. She started working in the music industry in 1996 by assisting promoters, record labels and club owners with business operations and marketing. The Worldwide Reggae Embassy™: In 2011, she began to diligently produce songs for the organization's clients such as Eldie Anthony, Ma'Niche, Cameal Davis, C-Zer, I-Noble, Tajji, Fyah Stain, and Blakk Sparrow.

She has produced for music composer such as Roadz (London, England), Asha D Records (Leeds, England), Steve Richards (Leeds, England), El Toro (Russia), K-Swizz (Jamaica), Mantis the Producer (Jamaica) and DJ Lanz 876 (Jamaica). The Worldwide Reggae Embassy™: she was contracted in 2011 as the Senior Executive Music Industry Trainer for the Music Embassies and have educated countless individuals worldwide in the Music Industry Training sessions that are offered by the Music Embassies.

Discography
 2014: Music Embassies Spotlight  (Album)

Albums 
This chart lists every artist who has appeared in at least three different albums by Christina Grand (including bonus tracks and remixes). Her most frequent collaborator is Eldie Anthony, who has appeared on seven songs, on Christina's first album.

Studio singles & albums

Music Embassies Spotlight, Vol. 1

1	Eldie Anthony – Break Free 				
2	C-Zer & Cameal Davis – Dreaming 	 
3	Ma'Niche – Thank You 	
4	Eldie Anthony – Singing in the Rain 	 
5	Cameal Davis – I Love Ya 	 
6	I-Noble – Rich and Wealthy 	
7	Eldie Anthony – Jah Is by My Side 	
8	Cameal Davis – Don't Give Up 	 
9	Eldie Anthony & I-Noble – Living for Tomorrow 	 
10	Ma'Niche – Start Over 	 
11	C-Zer – Life 	 
12	Eldie Anthony – Let Me Be Your Man 	
13	I-Noble – Mama Cry (Garrison Anthem) 	 
14	I-Noble – Knight in Shining Armour 	 
15	Eldie Anthony – I Will Go On 	
16	Ma'Niche – I'm Notorious 	 
17	C-Zer & Ma'Niche – Dancefloor Fantasy (feat. Tajji) 	 
18	I-Noble & Ma'Niche – The Way I Move 	 
19	Eldie Anthony & Ma'Niche – Dance If You're Dancing 	 
20	Cameal Davis – Wanna Dance

BMI 
2011: "*Christina huge victory with BMI
2011: "*Christina with BMI 2011"

References

External links
Christina Grand Official Website

American women record producers
Living people
Year of birth missing (living people)
Record producers from New Jersey